The Outer Lands is the prominent terminal moraine archipelagic region off the southern coast of New England in the United States. This eight-county region  of Massachusetts, Rhode Island, and New York, comprises the peninsula of Cape Cod and the islands of Nantucket, Martha's Vineyard, the Elizabeth Islands, the Narragansett Bay Islands, Block Island, Long Island, and Staten Island, as well as surrounding islands and islets.

Though the existence of an arc or chain of islands in this archipelago is widely acknowledged by geographers, it is rarely given a specific name; occasionally a descriptive term such as southern New England islands or a technical term such as Cape Cod/Long Island ecoregion or Long Island-Cape Cod Coastal Lowland is used. The Isles of Stirling was the name granted in 1635 when the islands came into the possession of William Alexander, 1st Earl of Stirling.  "Outer Lands" is a term popularized by author Dorothy Sterling in her 1967 natural history guide of the same name, and used by later natural history authors such as Patrick J. Lynch.

Divisions
The Massachusetts section is often called the "Cape and Islands", with the "Islands" subregion very specifically referring to Martha's Vineyard and Nantucket, and other smaller islands in Dukes and Nantucket counties.

Long Island is often informally considered a part of the "New York islands", together with Staten Island and Manhattan. These islands are geographically contiguous with the broader region. (The insular Massachusetts sections were actually part of the Province of New York for most of the late 17th century.)

Other islands in Long Island Sound and Rhode Island Sound are also included often.

Rarely, Sandy Hook in New Jersey is included.

Geology
The Outer Lands forms the insular northeasternmost extension of North America's Atlantic coastal plain. The islands of the Outer Lands were formed of terminal moraines deposited on a series of cuestas by the recession of the Laurentide Ice Sheet during the Wisconsin glaciation.

Some of the islands are included in the archipelago due to proximity, despite key geological differences, such as Manhattan, actually part of the Manhattan Prong.

The islands are separated from the mainland by a series of bays and sounds that used to make up Lake Connecticut, Lake Narragansett, and other glacial lakes.

Ecology

For eastern Long Island and areas east, the region is designated Environmental Protection Agency ecoregion 84 for the Atlantic coastal pine barrens, with the majority 84a for "Cape Cod/Long Island", and along the Long Island south shore 84c for "Barrier Islands/Coastal Marshes". Western Long Island and along the north shore is largely 59g for "Long Island Sound Coastal Lowland", a part of the broader Northeastern Coastal Zone.

The region is designated the "Long Island-Cape Cod Coastal Lowland", Major Land Resource Area 149B, by the United States Department of Agriculture, which also includes Staten Island.

Culture
The region has historically had a strong maritime culture, with an emphasis on fishing. From eastern Long Island east, much of the region has in recent decades taken on a summer colony character.

See also
Outer Barrier Islands
Thimble Islands
Narragansett Bay
Cape and Islands
New York Islands
Sandy Hook, New Jersey

References

Archipelagoes of the Atlantic Ocean
Coastal islands of Massachusetts
Islands of New York (state)
Islands of Rhode Island
Islands of Dukes County, Massachusetts
Landforms of Long Island
Islands of Nantucket, Massachusetts
Geographical neologisms
Moraines of the United States
Archipelagoes of the United States
Geography of New England
Coastal islands of Rhode Island